Vats-houll is a settlement in northwestern Whalsay in the parish of Nesting in the Shetland islands of Scotland. The village overlooks the loch of the same name on the northwestern bank.  An unroofed structure at Vats-houll on the bank of the loch was shown on the 1st edition of the OS 6-inch map of Orkney & Shetland in 1882.

References

External links

Scottish Places - Vats-houll, Loch
Canmore - Whalsay, Loch Vats-Houll site record
Canmore - Whalsay, Loch Vats-Houll site record

Villages in Whalsay
Lochs of Whalsay